Bunnytown is an American children's television program that aired on Playhouse Disney in the United States and the United Kingdom, as well as several other countries. Reruns of the show continued to air after their initial broadcast episode dates, but was removed in May 2014. The full series can be streamed on iTunes and Apple TV. The merchandise was only little to produce. Disney licensed official plush toys, that were produced in limited quantities, and the DVD, Hello Bunnies, released on March 17, 2009.

Broadcast history
The program, created by David Rudman, his brother Adam and Todd Hannert, under their Spiffy Pictures banner, began airing in Canada on November 3, 2007, and in the USA a week later.
 
United Kingdom viewers got a premiere of the program on January 13, 2008, on the Playhouse Disney channel sublet of pay-broadcaster Family Channel. In France, the series began on January 27, 2008, and kept its original title Bunnytown. The show was produced at Elstree Studios with many of the "Peopletown" segment exterior scenes done at Clarence Park and Verulamium Park in St Albans.

The series only ran for 1 season and 26 episodes total, which finished its run on November 8, 2008.

The shorts can currently be shown on YouTube and DisneyNOW.

Format
The basic format features between ten and twelve segments as follows:
A running gag setting up some sort of problem played out in four parts such as bunnies getting ready to race, drumming, etc. For example, the bunnies get ready for a race in the first episode "Hello Bunnies!" but they end up disco dancing in the first part (events with disco balls usually happen in the third part in most episodes), sleeping in the second, flying in the third and finally racing in the fourth part before the ending song but there is a tape at the finish line which flies them back to the start of the race, but they failed again.
Red and Fred, a silent comedy-slapstick pratfall team in Peopletown made up of a fat ginger haired man and a smaller, thin dark haired male, played by Ed Gaughan and Andrew Buckley. This is done in the vein of Laurel and Hardy, who have the same style as Red and Fred. On the US broadcast, they are known as "Two Best Friends". Before this scene, a bunny named Bart Bunnytoes travels through an underground tunnel system to reach Peopletown, where he watches the events before leaving.
The Adventures of Super-Bunny, created new for Bunnytown follows the format of Little Bad Bunny stealing carrots from Bunnytown, and Super-Bunny comes to the rescue.
The Bunnytown Hop, done by a rock-and-roll band inspired by mega groups such as Earth, Wind and Fire. Characters from earlier segments may take part in this song.
Super Silly Sports, also held in Peopletown, hosted by Pinky Pinkerton (portrayed by Scottish actress Polly Frame), best known for her wearing a pink Alice band in her blonde bouffant hairdo along with a matching neck scarf and sportsjacket over a white tennis dress, along with pink and white-striped above-the-knee socks. An example of this spoofing of sports contests and their telecasts within is a staring contest between an 11-year-old boy and an Idaho potato (because both of them have "eyes").  Pinky's signature exclamation is "Oh me, oh my!" done multiple times. Just like in the Red and Fred segments, Bart travels through the underground tunnels to watch the events.
After the payoff of the running gag, all of the bunnies gather to sing the closing song "It's a Bunnytown Life", followed by a bunny blowing on a party horn.
 The Bunnytown segments Two Best Friends (Red and Fred) and Super Silly Sports were formerly shown in bumper segments on Disney Junior.

Puppets, characters and sets
The bunny rod puppets (which take up to eight puppeteers to operate with a trigger at the bottom to move their mouths and invisible marionette strings to work from above on all other parts) are made from foam rubber and covered in fake fur.

Characters include the many types of characters found in pop culture and storybooks. Included are a king and his court (supposedly the leaders of Bunnytown as they live in a castle), pirates, a superhero bunny, a female bunny who is an astronaut, two cave bunnies and their pet dinosaur, an inventor, a farmer and his helpers and many more.

Cast

Puppeteers 

 Alice Dinnean-Vernon
 Eric Jacobson
 Mark Jefferis
 Nigel Plaskitt
 David Rudman
 Victoria Willing
 Mak Wilson

Episodes

References

External links
 
 

2007 American television series debuts
2008 American television series endings
2000s American children's comedy television series
2000s preschool education television series
American preschool education television series
American television shows featuring puppetry
Disney Channel original programming
Television series about rabbits and hares
Television series by Disney
Disney Junior original programming
Television shows shot at Elstree Film Studios
English-language television shows